Birzeit, also Bir Zeit, is a Palestinian Christian town north of Ramallah, in the central West Bank. Its population in the 2007 census was 4,529. Birzeit is the home to Birzeit University and to the Birzeit Brewery.

Location
It is bordered by Jifna and Ein Siniya  to the east, 'Atara  to the north, Burham, Kobar and Al-Zaytouneh  to the west, and Abu Qash  to the south.

History
Sherds from the Iron Age II, Hellenistic, Roman, Byzantine and Mamluk eras have been found.

West of the town, at Khirbat Bir Zait, sherds have been found from Iron Age I to early Ottoman era. Here are the remains of a building which have been dated to the Crusader era. Guérin  first noted the remains of a buildings  50 paces on each side. He thought it could be from the Byzantine era, or later.

Ottoman era
The village was incorporated into the Ottoman Empire in 1517 with all of Palestine, and in 1596 it appeared in the tax registers under the name of Bir Zayt, as being in the nahiya of Jabal Quds in the liwa of Quds, with a   population of 26 households. The inhabitants of the village paid taxes on wheat, barley, olive trees, vineyards, fruit trees, and goats and/or beehives; a total of 6,600 akçe.

In 1838 it was noted as a small Christian village, north-west of Jifna.

The French explorer Victor Guérin visited the village in July 1863. He found it to have a population of 1,800 inhabitants, of those 140 were Latin Catholics, the others were "schismatic Greeks" and Muslims. The Catholic parish was administered by a young French missionary, Father Joly. The irrigated gardens were well grown, and the soil naturally fertile. It abounded in vines, figs and pears. He also noted some beautiful walnut trees.

Socin, citing an official Ottoman village list compiled around 1870, noted that  Bir Zet as having 73 houses and a male population of 250. Of this, 75 men in 20 houses were Muslim, while 175 men in 53 houses were "Latin" Christian.

In 1882, the PEF's Survey of Western Palestine (SWP) described Bir Zeit as "a Christian village of moderate size, containing a Greek Church and a Latin Church, with a well to the north, and olives round it." The red-tiled roof of the Latin Church on top of the ridge was a conspicuous feature in the landscape.

In 1896 the population of Bir ez-zet was estimated to be about 786 Christians and 192 Muslims.

In 1906, a British missionary of the Church Missionary Society wrote about an outbreak of cholera in Birzeit thirty years before that began when the mother of a young man who died of cholera in Nablus washed his clothes in the village spring. The disease quickly spread and within a week killed 30 people out of a population of 200–300. The epidemic ended when a village elder ordered the entire population to camp in their vineyards. Three men remained to bury the dead and there were no further victims. The author felt that the incident was notable "as there was no European hand in it from first to last, and it shows what the Fellahin are capable of under wise and energetic native guidance."

British Mandate era
In the 1922 census of Palestine conducted by the British Mandate authorities, the village, called Bair Zait, had a total population of 896; 119   Muslims and 777 Christian; 399 Orthodox, 253 Roman Catholics and 125 Anglicans. In the 1931 census, the village had 251 occupied houses and a total population of 1233; 362 Muslims and 871 Christians.

In the 1945 statistics the population was 1,560; 570 Muslims and 990 Christians, while the total land area was 14,088 dunams, according to an official land and population survey. Of this, 6,908 were allocated for plantations and irrigable land, 2,414 for cereals, while 402 dunams were classified as built-up (urban) areas.

Jordanian era 
In the wake of the 1948 Arab–Israeli War, and after the 1949 Armistice Agreements, Birzeit came under Jordanian rule. It was annexed by Jordan in 1950.

The Jordanian census of 1961 found 3,253 inhabitants in Bir Zeit'.

1967–present
Since the Six-Day War in 1967, Birzeit  has been under Israeli occupation.

After the 1995 accords, 75.8% of village land was classified as Area B, the remaining 24.2% as Area C.1995 Oslo Interim Agreement . Text of the Accord

Landmark buildings

The town has 200 historic buildings, including over 100 in the old part of town, some dating back to the Mamluk era. Birzeit University was formerly located there. Dozens of buildings vacated by the university's move to Ramallah were restored, reinvigorating social and economic development.

 Religion 
A predominantly Christian town, there are three Christian churches in Birzeit – one Orthodox, one Roman Catholic, and one Episcopal/Anglican.

The oldest one is St George Orthodox Church; now the Orthodox Christian community is building another large Orthodox Church, and an Orthodox Christian school that is considered to be the largest in the West Bank.

The Catholic church of Our Lady Queen of Peace - Guadalupe was founded in 1858; it also runs a Catholic high school.

Bir Zeit also has an Episcopal/Anglican church, St. Peter's church.

 Education and culture 
The annual Maftoul Festival takes place in Birzeit in October. Women from different villages prepare couscous dishes and are judged by a jury of professional chefs. The goal of the festival is to highlight traditional Palestinian food, empower women and promote rural tourism. It is organized by the Rozana Association for Development and Architectural Heritage, the Palestinian Circus School, the Palestinian Ministry of Culture, Birzeit Women's Charitable Society, the Palestinian Chefs Association, Heritage House and Birzeit Club.
There is also yearly festival named the heritage week and it is a celebration of different aspects of the villagers life and to it comes many participants to represent their villages customs and traditions from wedding ceremonies to clothes, also in July.

 Notable residents 
Kamal Nasser
Sumaya Farhat Naser

See also
 Palestinian Christians

References

Bibliography

 
 
 

 
  
 
 

  
  
 
    
Toledano, E., 1979, ‘The Sanjaq of Jerusalem in the Sixteenth Century - Patterns of Rural Settlement and Demographic Trends,” in A. Cohen, ed., Jerusalem in the Early Ottoman Period, Jerusalem, 61-92 (in Hebrew). 
 

Further reading
 David Lynch: A Divided Paradise: An Irishman in the Holy Land''. (New Island, Jan 2009)

External links
 Welcome To Bir Zeit
Survey of Western Palestine, Map 14:     IAA, Wikimedia commons
 Bir Zeit (Fact Sheet),   Applied Research Institute–Jerusalem (ARIJ)
 Bir Zeit (Village profile), ARIJ
 Bir Zeit (photo), ARIJ
 Locality Development Priorities and Needs in Bir Zeit Town, ARIJ
 Birzeit Society
 St George Orthodox Church site 

 
Towns in the West Bank
Palestinian Christian communities
Municipalities of West Bank